Kerriston is an extinct town in King County, in the U.S. state of Washington. The GNIS classifies it as a populated place.

A post office called Kerriston was established in 1904, and remained in operation until 1935. The community most likely derived its name from the local Kerry Mill Company.

References

Ghost towns in Washington (state)
Geography of King County, Washington